The Cottonwood Mountains are a mountain range in Riverside County, California. They lie between the Little San Bernardino Mountains to the west, and Eagle Mountains to the east and  the Hexie Mountains to the north.  They are partially included in the Joshua Tree Wilderness.

References 

Mountain ranges of Riverside County, California
Mountain ranges of Southern California